The Mob is an English anarcho-punk band, formed in Yeovil, Somerset in the late 1970s.

Background 
The band's initial line-up consisted of Mark Wilson (vocals, guitar), Curtis Youé (bass guitar) and Graham Fallows (drums). Later drummers included Adie Tompkins, Tim Hutton and Joseph Porter. The Mob disbanded in 1983 and reformed in 2011, playing a number of gigs with the original members. The first was on 8 April 2011 at The Fleece in Bristol and later in the year, The Levellers' Beautiful Days Festival in Devon on 20 August. North American shows followed in October 2012, and various European gigs in 2012/13. Their first new release in almost 30 years was the single Rise Up! in August 2013. Further North American/European dates followed in 2014/15.

All the Madmen Records   
All the Madmen Records is a record label started by The Mob in Yeovil before Mark Wilson and Curtis Youé relocated to London in the early 1980s. Profits from the band's Let the Tribe Increase LP were ploughed back into the label, co-organised by members of the collective that published the Kill Your Pet Puppy zine. Today, All the Madmen Records is housed in Rockaway Park, a commune based in Temple Cloud, Somerset.All the buildings on the Rockaway Park grounds were designed and built by Mark Mob (Wilson) and contain large percentages of recycled materials that were sourced from various places.

Reunion  
The Mob reunited in 2011 with the band’s original line-up. Wilson had heard of a surprise party planned for his upcoming birthday that was to feature a (The Mob) cover band and decided he would rather perform himself. The original members of the band agreed to join him. Prior to this reunion Wilson stated that he had not touched a guitar in 20 years. After gigs around the UK the band played in various countries across Europe. A tour of the US and Canada followed in 2012 which included headlining the 'Chaos in Tejas' festival in Austin, Texas.

Discography

Singles

Albums

Compilations

References

External links 
 

English punk rock groups
British musical trios
Anarcho-punk groups
Crass